Brian Stankiewicz (born 20 June 1956) is an Austrian ice hockey player. He competed in the men's tournaments at the 1988 Winter Olympics and the 1994 Winter Olympics.

References

1956 births
Living people
Olympic ice hockey players of Austria
Ice hockey players at the 1988 Winter Olympics
Ice hockey players at the 1994 Winter Olympics
Ice hockey people from Toronto